Thomas Reddall High School is a government-funded co-educational comprehensive secondary day school, located in Ambarvale, a south-western suburb of Sydney, New South Wales, Australia.

Established in 1991, the school caters to approximately 570 students from Year 7 to Year 12, including 10 percent who identify as Indigenous Australians and 39 percent from a language background other than English. The school is operated by the New South Wales Department of Education.

Overview 
The first class completed the NSW Higher School Certificate in 1996.

Prior to 1991, the site of the present school was occupied by Ambarvale High School and made up entirely of demountable classrooms. Ambarvale High School was relocated to the suburb of Rosemeadow. As a result, despite its name Ambarvale High School today predominantly serves the suburb of Rosemeadow whereas Thomas Reddall High School predominantly serves the suburb of Ambarvale.

The school is named after Thomas Reddall, the first Anglican clergyman appointed to Campbelltown. Reddall supervised the  construction of nearby St Peter's Church of England, Campbelltown, and lived in what is now the suburb of Glen Alpine, which forms part of the school's catchment area.

See also 

 List of government schools in New South Wales
 Education in Australia

References

External links 
 

South Western Sydney
Public high schools in Sydney
Educational institutions established in 1991
1991 establishments in Australia